Mata do Jambreiro Private Natural Heritage Reserve is a state-regulated private natural heritage reserve to the south east of Belo Horizonte, Minas Gerais, Brazil.

History

The reserve contains  of seasonal forest in the municipality of Nova Lima in the state of Minas Gerais.
There was concern that the Aguas Claras Mine, opened in the 1970s, would cause environmental damage.
The Vale mining company therefore leased the area to the government of Minas Gerais for twenty years, while taking responsibility for conservation measures.
The Mata do Jambreiro Biological Reserve (Reserva Biológica Mata do Jambreiro) was established on 26 January 1979 when a special committee was set up to implement the reserve to preserve the local ecology.

After the lease expired the mining company regained control, and created the Jambreiro Private Natural Heritage Reserve (Reserva Particular do Patrimônio Natural do Jambreiro).
 of high biodiversity continue to be preserved.
It is administered by the State Forestry Institute in partnership with the MBR mining company.
Because it does not meet regulatory requirements, the station is not eligible for the ICMBio Ecological incentives.

Ecology

The reserve is part of the Southern Environmental Protection Area, certified as a Brazilian biosphere reserve by UNESCO.
It lies in the transition zone between the cerrado and Atlantic Forest biomes.
Most of the area was deforested in the first half of the 20th century, and the forest has also suffered from fires, so much of the vegetation is secondary regrowth.

Higher up there are stony fields with sparse shrubs such as Lychnophora ericoides and Mimosa calodendron, and herbaceous plants such as Pleurothallis teres, Sophronittis crispata, Sophronittis caulescens, Epidendrum secundum and Oncidium gracile.
The reserve is home to the Coimbra Filho's titi (Callicebus coimbrai), lontra,  southern tamandua (Tamandua tetradactyla),  white-throated hummingbird (Leucochloris albicollis) and blue manakin (Chiroxiphia caudata).

Notes

Sources

1979 establishments in Brazil
Private natural heritage reserves of Brazil
Protected areas of Minas Gerais